Podzamcze  is a village in the administrative district of Gmina Ogrodzieniec, within Zawiercie County, Silesian Voivodeship, in southern Poland.

The village has a population of 1,011.

References

Villages in Zawiercie County